Koami-cho is a Hiroden station (tram stop) on Hiroden Main Line, located in Koami-cho, Naka-ku, Hiroshima. There are no platforms because of the narrow street.

Routes
From Koami-cho Station, there are two of Hiroden Streetcar routes.

 Hiroshima Station - Hiroden-miyajima-guchi Route
 Hiroden-nishi-hiroshima - Hiroshima Port Route

Connections
█ Main Line
 
Dobashi — Koami-cho — Tenma-cho

Around station
Peace Boulevard

History
Opened on December 8, 1911.
Service was stopped on June 10, 1944.
Service restarted on August 15, 1945.

See also
Hiroden Streetcar Lines and Routes

References

Koami-cho Station
Railway stations in Japan opened in 1911